Emiliano Rudolf Giambelli, best known as Emis Killa (born 14 November 1989), is an Italian rapper.

Biography and career
Emis Killa was born in Vimercate to a Sicilian mother from Palermo who worked as a metalworker and a Lombard father who also performed as a musician. Emis Killa’s father struggled with bipolar disorder and died due to cardiac arrest in 2010.

2007–2010: The beginnings
In 2007, at just 17 years old, he was the winner of an Italian freestyle competition called TecnichePerfette.
Emis Killa cooperated with the independent company Blocco Recordz with which he published a mixtape, Keta Music (2009), followed by the album Champagne e Spine (2010).

2011–2012: The Flow Clocker Vol.1 and L'erba cattiva
In 2011 he published the mixtape The Flow Clocker vol. 1, followed by the album L'erba cattiva (2012).

The music video for his song "Parole di ghiaccio" (meaning Cold words), the third track from the album L'erba cattiva, received 7.5 million views on YouTube in less than two weeks, reaching 20 million in three months, breaking the record for Italian music.

2013–2015: Mercurio
On 12 July 2013, Emis Killa published Vampiri, as an anticipation of the rapper's second studio album. The video clip of the song was successfully released on July 17.

2020: 17 with Jake La Furia
On 18 September 2020, Emis Killa released 17, an album in collaboration with Jake La Furia.

Awards and nominations
On 5 May 2012, Emis Killa won "Best emerging artist of 2012" at the TRL awards.

On 12 December 2012, during the Hip Hop Awards in the category of Best New Artist and Best Collaboration he won along with Club Dogo, J-Ax and Marracash with his song "Se il mondo fosse".

In January 2015, Mercurio received a nomination for IMPALA's European Independent Album of the Year Award.

Discography

Albums
 Il peggiore (2011)
 L'erba cattiva (2012)
 Mercurio (2013)
 Terza stagione (2016)
 Supereroe (2018)

References

1989 births
Living people
People from Vimercate
Italian rappers
People of Sicilian descent
MTV Europe Music Award winners
21st-century Italian male musicians